One Eyed Jacks is the second studio album by Spear of Destiny, released by Burning Rome Records in 1984.

Track listing
All songs written by Kirk Brandon

 "Rainmaker" - 2:55
 "Young Men" - 3:13
 "Everything You Ever Wanted" - 4:36
 "Don't Turn Away" - 3:38
 "Liberator" - 3:39
 "Prisoner of Love" - 3:36
 "Playground of the Rich" - 4:45
 "Forbidden Planet" - 3:14
 "Attica" - 2:34
 "These Days Are Gone" - 5:41

Personnel
Spear of Destiny
Kirk Brandon - vocals, guitar
Stan Stammers - bass guitar
Dolphin Taylor - drums, vocals
Neil Pyzer - keyboards, saxophone, piccolo flute
Mickey Donnelly - saxophone
Alan St Clair - guitar
Technical
Gary Langan - mixing
Pete Wilson - mixing on "Prisoner of Love"
David Levine, Steve Rapport - photography

Recording
With the exception of "These Days Are Gone", "Playground of the Rich" and "Prisoner of Love", all songs had been performed live by the original Spear of Destiny line-up for nearly a year prior to the recording of One Eyed Jacks.  "Everything You Ever Wanted", "Attica", "Rainmaker", "Young Men", "Forbidden Planet" and "Don't Turn Away" were introduced to live sets in March 1983, with "Young Men" going by the title of "Remembrance (Every Other Day)".  "Liberator" was introduced to live shows in the early summer of 1983. The final live performance of the original line-up of Spear of Destiny took place on 9 June 1983, followed by a television studio performance on 8 July.

August saw Spear of Destiny return to the stage, this time with the introduction of Dolphin Taylor on drums, Neil Pyzer on saxophone, piano, and organ, and John Lennard on saxophone.  The new line-up featured a dramatic reworking of the songs that were to eventually become One Eyed Jacks, along with the introduction of "Playground of the Rich" and "Rosie", a song that would later be featured as the b-side to the line up's first recorded output, the single "Prisoner of Love".  A tour in November premiered "The Last Card".  Although it proceeded the release of One Eyed Jacks by six months, "The Last Card" would not be featured on a studio recording until the release of the "All My Love (Ask Nothing)" single in 1985.

"Prisoner of Love" was added to the live set in December 1983 and would be released as the first single for the record in January 1984.  By this time, John Lennard had left the band, replaced by Mickey Donnelly. The band also added Alan St Clair as a second guitarist. St Clair had previously worked for Kirk Brandon as a guitar technician.

1984 albums
Spear of Destiny (band) albums
Epic Records albums